Kunzea caduca  is a plant in the myrtle family, Myrtaceae and is endemic to Queensland. It is a spreading shrub with linear to lance-shaped leaves and groups of white to cream-coloured flowers on the ends of all the branches from late winter to early spring. It is only known from a few locations and only conserved in the Castle Tower National Park near Gladstone.

Description
The leaves are more or less glabrous and more than sixty coarse glands are visible on the lower surface. The sepals are broadly triangular to egg-shaped, ridged near their tips and glabrous.

Taxonomy and naming
Kunzea caduca was first formally described in 2016 by Hellmut Toelken and the description was published in Journal of the Adelaide Botanic Gardens. The specific epithet (caduca) is a Latin word meaning "falling" or "deciduous" referring to the bracts and bracteoles which fall off before the flower fully opens.

Distribution and habitat
This kunzea grows on steep hills on mountains with intrusive rocks in woodland and shrubland in a few locations near Gladstone.

References

caduca
Flora of Queensland
Plants described in 2016
Myrtales of Australia
Endemic flora of Australia
Taxa named by Hellmut R. Toelken